is a Japanese diplomat. Hideaki studied law at the University of Tokyo. He entered the Japanese Ministry of Foreign Affairs in 1968. From 1988 to 1990, he served as Counselor of the Japanese Embassy in Australia. From 1990 to 1992 he served as Counsellor of the Japanese Embassy in Poland. From 2005 to 2008, he served as Japanese Ambassador to Thailand.

External links
 Professional CV

1945 births
Living people
Ambassadors of Japan to Thailand
University of Tokyo alumni